Paul Mabille (1835 – 6 April 1923) was a French naturalist mainly interested in Lepidoptera and botany.

Mabille was born in 1835 in Tours, France. He was a member and President (1876–1877) of the Société entomologique de France and a member of the Société entomologique de Belgique. His Madagascar collections, once in the Charles Oberthur collection, are now in the Natural History Museum, London.

He wrote many papers on Neotropical Hesperiidae with Eugène Boullet. Mabille died in April 1923 in Perreux, Loire.

Works
partial list
Wikispecies (see below) provides another list and links to digitised papers by Mabille

1876 Diagnoses d’Hesperiens Bulletin de la Société Entomologique de France (5)213–215.   
1876 Sur la classification des Hesperiens avec la description de plusieurs espèces nouvelles. Annales de la Société Entomologique de France (5)251–274.   
1876 Catalogue des Lepidopteres de la cote occidental d’Afrique. Bulletin de la Société Zoologique de France 1:194–203; 274–281.   
1877 La description de trois espèces nouvelles de lepidopteres de Madagascar Bulletin de la Société Entomologique de France (5)37–39.   
1877 Diagnoses de nouvelles espèces d’Hesperides Bulletin de la Société Entomologique de France (5)39–40.   
1877 Diagnoses de quelques espece nouvelles de Lepidopteres provenent de Madagascar. Bulletin de la Société Entomologique de France (5)71–73.   
1877 Diagnose d’Hesperides. Petites Nouvelles Entomoloqiques 2:114.   
1877 Diagnoses de Lepidopteres de Madagascar. Petites Nouvelles Entomoloqiques 2:157–158.
1883 Description d'hespéries. Bulletin de la Société Entomologique de Belgique 27:LI–LXXVIII.
1884 Descriptions de Lépidoptéres exotiques Bulletin de la Société Entomologique de Belgique 28 : clxxxiv–cxci, [184–191]
1908 Essai de révision de la famille des hespérides. Annales des Sciences naturelles (Zoologie) (9)7(4/6): 167 207, pls. 13 14
1912 Essai de révision de la famille des hespérides. Annales des Sciences naturelles (Zoologie) (9)16(1/4): 1 159, 2 pls. 
1916 Description d'hespérides nouveaux (Lep. Hesperiinae, Sect. B). Bulletin de la Société entomologique de France 1916(15): 243 247
1917 Description d'hespérides nouveaux (Lep. Hesperiinae, Sect. B). Bulletin de la Société entomologique de France 1916(20): 320 325 
1917 Description d'hespérides nouveaux (Lep.). Bulletin de la Société entomologique de France 1917(1): 54 60 
1917 Description d'hespérides nouveaux (Lep. Hesperiinae, Sect. B). Bulletin de la Société entomologique de France 1917(4): 97 101 
1919 Essai de révision de la famille des hespérides. Annales des Sciences naturelles (Zoologie) (10)2(4/6): 199 258
with Paul Vuillot
1890–1895. Novitates lepidopterologicae. Paris, Paul Vuillot.Various parts, text and plates 
See African Butterfly database for Mabille publications on butterflies of Africa

References 
 Jean Lhoste (1987). Les Entomologistes français. 1750–1950. INRA Éditions : 351 p.

 Groll, E. K. (Hrsg.): Biografien der Entomologen der Welt : Datenbank. Version 4.15 : Senckenberg Deutsches Entomologisches Institut, 2010 
Anonym 1923: [Mabille, P.] Entomological News and Proceedings of the Entomological Section of the Academy of Natural Sciences of Philadelphia, Philadelphia 34 (8)

1835 births
1923 deaths
20th-century French botanists
French lepidopterists
Presidents of the Société entomologique de France
19th-century French botanists